Dangerous Game is a 2017 British action film. It has been described as possibly “the worse football movie ever made”.

Plot

A footballer is forced into a life of crime in order to help clear his best friend from a gambling debt owed to gangsters.

Cast

Calum Best as Chris Rose
Amar Adatia as Adam Chopra
Darren Day as Demetri 
Lucy Pinder as Nicola
Malia Arkian as Dawn
Lee Stafford as Viktor
Martin Tyler as commentator
Chris Kamara as pundit
Jess Impiazzi as Ashley Queen
Gary Webster as Detective  Crawford 
Jessica-Jane Stafford as Karina

Release

Dangerous Game was out on 16 June 2017. There was a premiere in Leicester Square. Calum Best missed the start of the premiere despite being the main star as he missed his flight from Mykonos where he had been on holiday and had to charter an emergency helicopter.

Reception

Little White Lies (magazine) described it as “ridiculously silly” but “but somewhere within its bewildering make-up is a meta work which applies dream logic to a rejected plot from Footballers’ Wives, while staring contestants from Celebrity Big Brother. It is both terrible and utterly fascinating.” The Independent declared “As a directorial debut, Richard Colton really has served up a turkey”. The Guardian argued the film might not actually exist but rather had been “precision engineered specifically to send me – and me alone – to the point of gibbering meltdown. I mean, it can’t be real. It just can’t.” As the chosen film on the 4th film club episode from Quickly Kevin, Will He Score? host Josh Widdicombe described it as “the worse acted 90 minutes I have seen of anything, and I include school nativities in that”.

References

External links

2017 action films
British association football films